Full Disclosure is a 2005 short film about a man who decides to try dating with a policy of "Full Disclosure", revealing all his faults, big and small, to people he dates on the first date.

External links
 

2005 films
2000s English-language films